The Palmer Baronetcy, of Grinkle Park in the County of York and of Newcastle upon Tyne, was created in the Baronetage of the United Kingdom on 31 July 1886 for Charles Palmer, a coal and shipping magnate and Liberal politician. The third Baronet, residing at Walworth Castle was High Sheriff of Durham in 1915.  The title vests in its fifth holder.

Palmer baronets, of Grinkle Park and of Newcastle upon Tyne (1886)
Sir Charles Mark Palmer, 1st Baronet (1822–1907)
Sir George Robson Palmer, 2nd Baronet (1849–1910)
Sir Alfred Molyneux Palmer, 3rd Baronet (1853–1935)
Sir Anthony Frederick Mark Palmer, 4th Baronet (1914–1941)
Sir (Charles) Mark Palmer, 5th Baronet (born 1941)

The heir apparent is Arthur Morris Palmer (born 1981), son of the above.

See also
 Palmer baronets

Notes

Baronetcies in the Baronetage of the United Kingdom
1886 establishments in the United Kingdom